Bembra is a village in the Kamalnagar Taluka of the Bidar district in the Indian state of Karnataka. It is also known as Bembri in the Kannada language. The village is occupied mostly by Maratha peoples, along with a Lingayats community

Geography
Bembra is 5 km from Thana Kushnoor, which has a busy transport facility; 18 km from Aurad Taluka; 25 km from Taluka Bhalki, 40 km from Udgir, and 44 km from Bidar.

Teacher's Village
Bembra village has  number of teachers who are servicing in educational sector.

Villages in Bidar district